August von Kreling (May 23, 1818 – April 23, 1876) was a German sculptor born in Osnabrück. He studied with Peter von Cornelius, and in 1853 became director of the Academy of Fine Arts Nuremberg. He became a member of the Munich Academy in 1876, and died in Nuremberg in that same year.

Commissions
 His best-known commission in the United States was the Tyler Davidson Fountain, Cincinnati, Ohio, 1871

References

External links

1818 births
1876 deaths
German male sculptors
Academic staff of the Academy of Fine Arts, Nuremberg
19th-century German sculptors
Writers from Osnabrück
19th-century German male artists